Calotes goetzi is a species of agamid lizard. It is found in China, Laos, Myanmar, and Thailand as well as introduced in Singapore.

References

Calotes
Reptiles of China
Reptiles of Laos
Reptiles of Myanmar
Reptiles of Thailand
Reptiles described in 2021